Phanoptis fatidica is a moth of the family Notodontidae. It is found from Venezuela west to Colombia, then south along the eastern slope of the Andes to central Peru.

Adults have uniformly iridescent blue-black forewings and hindwings with a single white transverse forewing band.

References

Moths described in 1910
Notodontidae of South America